Events of the year 2022 in the Democratic Republic of the Congo.

Events

February 

 February 2 - Around 60 people are killed in an attack by members of the CODECO paramilitary.

March 

 March 27 - The March 23 Movement begins an offensive
 March 29 - 2022 MONUSCO helicopter crash

May 

 28 May - 24 people die in an attack by militants in Beni region.

June 

 June 5 - Between 18 and 27 people are killed in a massacre by suspected Allied Democratic Forces fighters in Otomabere, Irumu Territory, Ituri Province.

July 

 25 July – Protests against MONUSCO begin in Goma.

September 

 27 September – The Ministry of Health of the Democratic Republic of the Congo formally declares an end to the latest outbreak of Ebola.

October 
 30 October - Government expels Rwandan ambassador to Congo after alleged Rwandan government support for M23 rebels.

References 

 
2020s in the Democratic Republic of the Congo
Years of the 21st century in the Democratic Republic of the Congo
Democratic Republic of the Congo
Democratic Republic of the Congo